The Universal Orlando Resort is an amusement park resort located in Orlando, Florida. Both parks feature several attractions and shows based on movies produced by Universal Pictures.

After several delays during construction, Universal Studios Florida opened to the public on June 7, 1990; however, several of the park's major attractions experienced frequent mechanical and technical problems, forcing the rides to close. Eventually, Universal filed a lawsuit against the manufacturer of Jaws, an attraction that was based on the film. 

Three years later, Universal announced the construction of a second theme park, Islands of Adventure, that officially opened on May 28, 1999.

One of the most popular additions to the resort is The Wizarding World of Harry Potter, an incorporation of the Harry Potter franchise. Opened in 2010, part of the Lost Continent area of the Islands of Adventure park was re-themed to Hogsmeade. Also, a replica of Hogwarts was constructed, with a dark ride, Harry Potter and the Forbidden Journey, located inside. In 2014, an area themed after Diagon Alley opened in the former location of Jaws within Universal Studios Florida. This addition included Harry Potter and the Escape from Gringotts, as well the Hogwarts Express based on the Hogwarts Express that allows guests to travel between Hogsmeade and Diagon Alley without actually having to exit either park.

In 2015, Universal permanently installed metal detectors at three of their roller coasters. These were Hollywood Rip Ride Rockit, the defunct Dragon Challenge and The Incredible Hulk Coaster. The metal detectors would also be added to VelociCoaster in 2021.

On January 15, 2023, Woody Woodpecker's KidZone and its rides Woody Woodpecker's Nuthouse Coaster and Fievel's Waterslide, the play areas Curious George Goes to Town and Fievel's Playland, and the Shrek-themed meet-and-greet style attraction which was opened the year before after the closure of Shrek 4-D, were permanently closed to make room for an unannounced area rumored to be themed to DreamWorks Animation.

Attractions

Roller coasters

Motion simulators

Other rides

Live shows and play areas

Notes

 Denotes the requirement that guests must have an admission ticket that allows visits to both Universal Studios Florida and Islands of Adventure.
 Denotes that height requirements are in inches.

References

External links
 Attractions at Universal Studios Florida
 Attractions at Islands of Adventure

Universal Studios Florida
Universal Studios Florida
Universal Parks & Resorts lists
Islands of Adventure
Universal Parks & Resorts attractions by name
Universal